Saylor Township is a township in Polk County, Iowa, United States.

History
Saylor Township is named after John B. Saylor, a pioneer settler.

References

Townships in Polk County, Iowa
Townships in Iowa